Lars-Eric Kjellgren (1918–2003) was a Swedish screenwriter and film director.

Selected filmography
 Night in Port (1943)
 Don't Give Up (1947)
 Private Bom (1948)
 Father Bom (1949)
 While the City Sleeps (1950)
 Customs Officer Bom (1951)
 Blondie, Beef and the Banana (1952)
 Say It with Flowers (1952)
 Bom the Flyer (1952)
 Hidden in the Fog (1953)
 No Man's Woman (1953)
 Violence (1955)
 The Hard Game (1956)
 Far till sol och vår (1957)
 Night Light (1957)
 Playing on the Rainbow (1958)
 Crime in Paradise (1959)

References

Bibliography
 Mariah Larsson & Anders Marklund. Swedish Film: An Introduction and Reader. Nordic Academic Press, 2010.

External links

1918 births
2003 deaths
Swedish film directors
20th-century Swedish screenwriters
20th-century Swedish male writers